The Bouclier de Brennus, or Brennus Shield in English, is a trophy awarded to the winners of the French rugby union domestic league.

The shield was not named, as it is often believed, after the famous Gallic warrior Brennus but rather artist Charles Brennus, co-founder of the Union des sociétés françaises de sports athlétiques (USFSA), the original governing body of rugby union in France. Charles Brennus sculpted the shield himself in 1892, based on an original design from his friend and fellow USFSA co-founder Pierre de Coubertin, the man who founded the modern Olympic Games. The trophy consists of a brass shield and plaque both fixed on a wooden support made of ash. The wooden frame gave the shield its nickname of Planchot, which means "plank" in Occitan (planchòt). The Brennus shield is one of the most recognisable trophies in France and is an integral part of French sporting folklore.

Birth
The Bouclier de Brennus was the brainchild of baron Pierre de Coubertin who recognised the need for a trophy to be awarded to the first winner of the Rugby union domestic league set up by the USFSA, which was, at the time, the organisation in charge of all amateur sporting competitions in France.

As president of USFSA Coubertin went to his good friend Charles Brennus, himself member of USFSA and professional engraver, to have a trophy made for the first final in French rugby history scheduled for the 20th of March, 1892.

The original design was Coubertin's idea, the trophy consists of a brass shield which includes the arms of USFSA as well as the moto "Ludus Pro Patria" (games for the nation), a plaque which would receive the names of the clubs winning the trophy and finally a wooden support made from ash.

Because Charles Brennus was also the president of Parisian club SCUF it was decided that this club would be the legal custodian of the trophy. Up until today tradition dictates that during the award ceremony that immediately follows the final of the French league, the trophy should be given to the winning team by 2 young players of the SCUF club.

Today
Like other sporting trophies, the Bouclier de Brennus had a very eventful life and by the end of the 20th century was in battered condition. A century of celebrations and resulting mistreatment, including the shield being used as a skateboard on several occasions, had taken its toll. Therefore, from 2003 it was decided that the trophy would be restored and kept in a safe place and that a replica would be made and awarded in lieu from then on.

The inaugural winner of the trophy was Racing Club de France in 1892. Up until 1898 only clubs from Paris could participate in the league; this changed in 1899 when Stade Bordelais (Bordeaux) won the title and became the first club outside of Paris to win the shield. As of today 27 clubs have had the honour to see their name engraved on the hallowed trophy. Clermont Auvergne were the most recent first-time champions, having won their first title in 2010. The most recent champions are Toulouse in 2021, and they have the record of winning titles with twenty-one victories.

Total wins
The following clubs have won the Bouclier de Brennus:

Winners by season
Source: French National Rugby League

Controversy
The 1993 French Rugby Union Championship was won by Castres who beat Grenoble 14-11 in the final, in a match decided by an irregular try accorded by the referee.

A try of Olivier Brouzet was denied to Grenoble and the decisive try by Gary Whetton was awarded by the referee, Daniel Salles, when in fact the defender Franck Hueber from Grenoble touched down the ball first in his try zone. This error gave the title to Castres.

Daniel Salles admitted the error 13 years later.

Jacques Fouroux conflict with the Federation cry out conspiracy.

Trivia
Although they are the legal custodian of the trophy, Parisian club SCUF have never won it. The closest the club came was in 1911 and 1913 when it lost the final on both occasions.
The original trophy had to be used one last time in 2004 when it was discovered that one of Perpignan's titles was missing from the replica.

See also
Top 14
Fédération Française de Rugby
List of sport awards
List of prizes named after people

References

Top 14
Rugby union trophies and awards
French sports trophies and awards
Awards established in 1892
1892 establishments in France